Ouessant was a French Navy  of the M6 ​​series commissioned in 1937. She participated in World War II on the side of the Allies until she was scuttled in 1940.

Characteristics

Ouessant was part of a fairly homogeneous series of 31 deep-sea patrol submarines also called "1,500-tonners" because of their displacement. All entered service between 1931 and 1939.

They displaced  on the surface and  underwater. When submerged, their two electric motors produced a combined  and allowed them to reach .

Construction and commissioning

Laid down at Arsenal de Cherbourg in Cherbourg, France, on either 30 January or 4 April 1932, according to different sources, with the hull number Q180, Ouessant was launched on 30 November 1934. She was commissioned on 1 February 1937.

Service history

1937–1939
Based on the experiences of other French submarines, which had made endurance cruises to places such as Argentina, Douala in French Cameroon, and French Indochina in Southeast Asia, an air refrigeration system was installed aboard Ouessant and her sister ship  to test its utility in improving the habitability of French submarines in tropical climates. In 1938, Ouessant′s ballast tanks were galvanized.

On 4 May 1938, Ouessant visited Dakar in Senegal.

World War II
At the start of World War II on 1 September 1939, Ouessant was assigned to the 8th Submarine Division of the 4th Submarine Squadron, an element of the 1st Squadron of the Forces de haute mer (High Seas Force), based at Brest, France. Her sister ships Agosta, and  made up the rest of the division. That day, Ouessant, Agosta, and their sister ships  and  got underway from Brest to investigate the waters around Vigo, Spain, and report on the presence of German ships and submarines there. France declared war on 3 September 1939, and on 4 September the mission was cancelled and the submarines returned to Brest.

On 14 September 1939, Ouessant, Agosta, Achille, Casabianca, and their sister ships  and  received orders to establish a permanent patrol off Vigo, where German merchant ships — which the Allies suspected of serving as supply ships for German U-boats — had taken refuge upon the outbreak of war. They continued the patrols off Vigo until the end of October 1939.

Ouessant and the rest of the 8th Submarine Division next left European waters and proceeded to Fort-de-France on Martinique in the French West Indies to conduct patrols in the vicinity of Trinidad the British had requested. Ouessant patrolled primarily in the Columbus Channel, also known as the Serpent's Mouth, between Trinidad and Venezuela.

On 12 January 1940, Ouessant departed Fort-de-France in company with Agosta bound for Brest. After a stop at Casablanca in French Morocco, the two submarines arrived at Brest on 1 February 1940 and began a major overhaul.

Ouessant was still undergoing overhaul when German ground forces advanced into France on 10 May 1940, beginning the Battle of France, and Italy declared war on France on 10 June 1940 and joined the invasion. As German ground forces approached Brest, Ouessant, unable to get underway, was scuttled at 19:00 on 18 June 1940 to prevent her capture by the Germans.

The Germans refloated Ouessant in 1942 to clear her berth and towed her to Bordeaux, France, where they hulked her for use as a floating power station. They scuttled her at Pauillac, France, in 1944.

Post-World War II
Ouessant was refloated again in  1948. She subsequently served as a wreck lifter along with Agosta.

References

Citations

Bibliography

 
 
 
 

Redoutable-class submarines (1928)
1936 ships
Ships built in France
World War II submarines of France
Maritime incidents in June 1940
Maritime incidents in 1944
Lost submarines of France
Scuttled vessels
Shipwrecks of France